Brierfield Swifts Football Club was an English association football club based in Brierfield, Lancashire. The team entered the FA Cup, the major English cup competition, for the first time in the 1907–08 but were knocked out in the preliminary round, losing 1–7 away at Rossendale United. In the next two years, Brierfield were beaten at the same stage by Darwen and Nelson. The team's furthest progression in the tournament occurred during their last entry into the Cup in 1910–11, when they defeated Padiham before losing to Haslingden in the first qualifying round.

FA Cup results

References

External links
The FA Cup results archive

Defunct football clubs in England
Defunct football clubs in Lancashire